In molecular biology, prokaryotic acetaldehyde dehydrogenase dimerisation domain is a protein domain found at the C-terminus of prokaryotic acetaldehyde dehydrogenases, it adopts a structure consisting of an alpha-beta-alpha-beta(3) core, which mediates dimerisation of the protein.

The acetaldehyde dehydrogenase family of bacterial enzymes catalyses the formation of acetyl-CoA from acetaldehyde in the 3-hydroxyphenylpropinoate degradation pathway. It occurs as a late step in the meta-cleavage pathways of a variety of compounds, including catechol, biphenyl, toluene, salicylate.

References

Protein domains